Fergusson Bridge  (or the Low-level bridge) is a pre-cast, prestressed concrete bridge in Cambridge, New Zealand, spanning the Waikato River. It cost £41,000, was designed by North, Swarbrick, Mills & Westwood and opened  in 1964. It was named after Governor-General Sir Bernard Fergusson.

The bridge is on the site of the original 1870 bridge and the 1876 Red Bridge.

References

External links 
 Google Street View from bridge

Bridges over the Waikato River
Bridges in Waikato
Cambridge, New Zealand